USS Competent (AFDM-6), (former YFD-62), was an AFDM-3-class floating dry dock built in 1943 and operated by the United States Navy.

Construction and career 
YFD-62 Auxiliary floating drydock was built at the Everett Pacific Shipbuilding Shipyard, in Everett, Washington in 1944. She was commissioned in June 1944.

In 1945, the dry dock was re-designated as AFDM-6.

In 1968, USS Wandank (ATA-204) performed island survey duties in the Western Carolinas and subsequently helped to search for AFDM-6 which had broken loose from her civilian tow vessel.

USS Carpenter (DD-825) while steaming towards Subic Bay that day, the crew discovered several leaks in the ship's hull. Moving immediately into dry dock AFDM-6 at Subic Bay, the rusted plating was repaired by work crews and Carpenter returned to Yankee Station on 5 November 1971. In 1972, the USS Higbee (DDR-806) was dry docked after being the first ship to be bombed during the Vietnam War. From 14 to 22 August 1975, USS Bronstein (FF-1037) returned to Subic Bay to have a hole in her shaft repaired while on the blocks in AFDM-6. In 1979, she as given the name Competent.

On 16 February 1981, USS Barbel (SS-580) moved into Competent at Pearl Harbor for a two-week drydock period. On 16 January 1984, USS Aspro (SSN-648) entered the floating drydock Competent for a restricted availability. USS Los Angeles (SSN-688) was dry docked from 9 May until 1 July 1986. From 20 May until 24 June 1987, the USS Bremerton (SSN-698) underwent dry docking inside Competent. On 1 March 1988, Los Angeles was again dry docked for Selected Restricted Availability and undocked on 11 May.

Bremerton started the year 1995 in drydock aboard the Competent. She was decommissioned in August 1997 and later stricken from the Naval Register on 21 August. The dry dock was donated to a private company to be used in Kalaeloa. LAter sold to PT Arpeni Pratama Ocean Line to be operated in Batam, Indonesia.

Awards 

 American Campaign Medal 
 Asiatic-Pacific Campaign Medal 
 World War II Victory Medal
 National Defense Service Medal
 Navy Meritorious Unit Commendation 
 Navy Battle "E" Ribbon (6 awards)

References

External links 
NavSource: AFDM-6
Naval Vessel Register: Competent (AFDM-6)

World War II auxiliary ships of the United States
Cold War auxiliary ships of the United States
Floating drydocks of the United States Navy
1944 ships
Ships built in Everett, Washington